Altererythrobacter palmitatis is a Gram-negative, rod-shaped, moderately thermophilic and motile bacterium from the genus of Altererythrobacter.

References 

Sphingomonadales
Bacteria described in 2017